Betaab valley, originally called as Hajan Valley or Hagan Valley, is situated at a distance of  from Pahalgam in the Anantnag district in India's union territory of Jammu and Kashmir. The valley got its name from the Sunny Deol-Amrita Singh hit debut film Betaab (1983). The Valley is towards northeast of Pahalgam and falls between Pahalgam and Chandanwadi and is en route Amarnath Temple Yatra. The valley surrounded by lush green meadows, snow clad mountains and covered with dense vegetation.

History
Betaab Valley, which is a part of Pahalgam area – one of the several sub-valleys of Kashmir Valley came into existence during the post geosynclinal stage of the development of the Himalayas. Betaab Valley lies between the two Himalayan Ranges – Pir Panjal and Zanskar. Archaeological evidence proves the human existence in this region from the Neolithic Age, especially at Burzahom, Bomai and Pahalgam. Betaab Valley – a part of the Kashmir region, was ruled by the Mughals since the 15th Century. In latter part of the 15th century the Turko-Mughal Military General Mirza Muhammad Haidar Dughlat ruled over Kashmir first on behalf of Sultan Said Khan of Kashgar and then on behalf of the Mughal Emperor Humayun. Ghiyas-ud-Din Zain-ul-Abidin invaded and ruled Kashmir region for about 40 years during which he was famous for promoting peace and harmony in Kashmir. He even gave a directive to restore and restructure Kashmir during his reign – in sharp contrast to the other plunderers who preceded him.

Tourism

Betab Valley is a very popular tourist destination in Jammu and Kashmir. Betaab Valley is also a favorite campsite of travelers as it also serves as a base camp for trekking and further exploration of the mountains. The valley is a walk-able distance from Pahalgam. The crystal clear and chilly water of the stream bubbling down from the snowy hills is a delight; locals here drink this water too. Baisaran and Tulian Lake are few nearby attractions that can be visited.

In popular culture
Kashmir was home to the Indian film industry from the sixties to the eighties. Scores of films were shot in the Valley like Aarzoo, Kashmir Ki Kali, Jab Jab Phool Khile, Kabhie Kabhie, Silsila, Satte Pe Satta and Roti. Film shooting almost came to a halt after militancy erupted in the Valley but with things improving now, one can hope that Bollywood would soon return to what many believe is its original home. The threat of militancy was a deterrent for over 30 years but with director Imtiaz Ali shooting for his film Rockstar in the valley with actors Ranbir Kapoor and Nargis Fakhri, the violence seems to be a thing of the past. The hut where Bobby was shot continues to be famous as the 'Bobby Hut'. Many films like Jab Tak Hai Jaan, Yeh Jawani Hai deewani, Haider have been shot in the Jammu and Kashmir state.

References

Tourist attractions in Anantnag district
Valleys of Jammu and Kashmir